RK Tineks Prolet (HC Tineks Prolet) is a team handball club from Skopje, Republic of North Macedonia. Currently, they compete in the Macedonian Handball Super League. The added name Tineks name comes from the Tinex supermarket which supports the team, while their original name Prolet is after the Skopje settlement of Prolet.

The club's main rival was RK Jug, now a defunct club who was from the neighboring settlement of Muchurin.

The team used to play in an open arena located in the settlement of Prolet, but after its dissolution changed few handball arenas around Skopje as Avtokomanda in the same called settlement and Rasadnik in Kisela Voda. Since 2012, the club finally is back in its own settlement as the Makedonsko Sonce Arena was built.

Tinex Arena
Tinex home Arena is Makedonsko Sonce Gym. It's a small Gym with 1000 seats. Its European cup matches HC Tinex plays at Trajkovski Arena.

Honours

Domestic competitions 
 Macedonian Champions
 1973

 Macedonian Handball Cup 
Winners  : 1972,1975

Current squad
Squad for the 2022–23 season

Goalkeepers
 12  Matej Ivanovski
 16  Andrej Petkovski 
 33  Danilo Mihaljević
Right Wingers
 11  Viktor Dodevski
 13  Martin Dimov
Left Wingers
9  Bojan Jovanovski
 71  Davor Palevski
Line players
 10  Stefan Donev

Left Backs
7  Aleksandar Vasilevski
8  Dejan Pecakovski
Central Backs
3  Jovan Fičorski
 15  Lasko Andonovski 
Right Backs
 19  Done Majnov

Former notable players

 Jane Cvetkovski
 Zlatko Daskalovski
 Stefan Kimevski
 Petar Angelov
 Jovica Mladenovski
 Mitko Stoilov
 Martin Manaskov
 Ivan Djonov
 Slavisha Dimitrijeski
 Branislav Angelovski
 Goran Kuzmanoski
 Tomislav Jagurinovski
 Vlatko Jovčevski
 Martin Popovski
 Darko Janev
 Mihail Alarov
 Tzouro Mujić
 Nikola Potić
 Đorđe Golubović
 Žarko Pejović

References

External links
RFM Profile
EHF Profile
Fan Club Forum
Macedonian Handball Federation

H

Tineks Prolet